Cordyline stricta, known as the Slender Palm Lily, or Narrow-leaved Palm Lily (not to be confused with C. congesta, which is also known by this common name) is an evergreen Australian plant. A shrub to 5 metres tall found in wet sclerophyll forest and rainforest, usually on the coastal lowlands. From near Bilpin, New South Wales further north to Queensland. C. stricta has become naturalised in Victoria.

Description 
Leaves are long and thin, 30 to 50 cm long, 1 to 2 cm wide. Mauve flowers form on panicles, 20 to 40 cm long. The flowering stem is 15 to 30 cm long. Fruit are purple to black, 10 to 15 mm in diameter. This is the only Australian species of Cordyline with black fruit.

Uses

Cultivation 
Cordyline stricta is widely planted in gardens and commercial landscapes for the ornamental value of both its foliage and flower heads and berries. Its tall, narrow growth makes it useful as a screen plant. C. stricta is adaptable to a wide range of climate and planting situations, from full sun to shade, and is moderately drought tolerant once established. It does not tolerate frost well.

Ecological 
Cordyline stricta is a host plant for Yellow-streaked Swift caterpillars.

References 

stricta
Plants described in 1825
Flora of New South Wales
Asparagales of Australia
Flora of Queensland
Butterfly food plants
Garden plants of Australia